William Arthur Parks (11 December 1868 – 3 October 1936) was a Canadian geologist and paleontologist, following in the tradition of Lawrence Lambe.

Parks was born in Hamilton, Ontario. After graduating with a Bachelor of Arts in 1892, Parks joined the University of Toronto's staff, where he taught geology, paleontology, and mineralogy. He went on to earn a PhD in 1900. He wrote 80 scientific papers in his lifetime. Parks died in Toronto, Ontario, in 1936.

Named taxa
 1919 Kritosaurus incurvimanus
 1922 Parasaurolophus walkeri
 1923 Corythosaurus intermedius
 1923 Lambeosaurus lambei
 1924 Dyoplosaurus acutosquameus
 1925 Arrhinoceratops brachyops
 1925 Neomeryx finni
 1926 Struthiomimus brevitertius (type species of Dromiceiomimus)
 1928 Struthiomimus samueli
 1928 Albertosaurus arctunguis
 1931 Tetragonosaurus praeceps
 1931 Tetragonosaurus erectofrons
 1933 Struthiomimus currelli
 1933 Struthiomimus ingens
 1933 Ornithomimus elegans (type species of Citipes)
 1935 Corythosaurus bicristatus
 1935 Corythosaurus brevicristatus
 1935 Corythosaurus frontalis

Honors
Parksosaurus was named in his honor by Charles M. Sternberg in 1937.

References

1868 births
1936 deaths
Canadian geologists
Canadian paleontologists
People from Hamilton, Ontario
University of Toronto alumni
Academic staff of the University of Toronto
Fellows of the Royal Society
Paleontology in Ontario